The 2012 Carolina RailHawks FC season was the sixth season of the club's existence. The RailHawks FC, played in the North American Soccer League, the second tier of the American soccer pyramid. The RailHawks are the defending NASL Regular Season Champions.

Review

Pre-season

April

The Carolina RailHawks opened the 2012 NASL season on the road April 7, playing the Minnesota Stars in the Metrodome. The game ended in a 0–0 draw, with both teams earning their first point of the season. They returned home to WakeMed Soccer Park April 14, where they earned a 4–4 draw against the Atlanta Silverbacks. The RailHawks traveled to the Tampa Bay Rowdies on April 18, where they earned another draw, this time 1–1. Carolina ended the month of April with back-to-back losses, beginning with a 3–1 defeat away to the Puerto Rico Islanders. On April 27 the RailHawks signed forward Zack Schilawski. Carolina concluded April with a 0–1 home loss to the San Antonio Scorpions.

May

Carolina opened the month of May with a 3–3 draw at home against the Fort Lauderdale Strikers. This match saw Zack Schilawski make his first appearance for the RailHawks. The RailHawks lost at FC Edmonton 3–0 on May 6 on a hat trick by Edmonton forward Shaun Saiko                            followed by a 2–1 road loss to the Minnesota Stars on May 12. U.S. international prospect Gale Agbossoumonde made his RailHawks debut during the May 12 game at Minnesota after missing the first month of the regular season with a foot injury. On May 18 the Carolina RailHawks announced the signing of midfielder Nick Millington and defender Jamie Finch. The RailHawks returned home on May 19 and earned a 1–1 draw against the Puerto Rico Islanders.

May 22 marked the beginning of U.S. Open Cup play for the Carolina RailHawks. They earned a 6–0 win in their second-round game against USASA team PSA Elite. The following week the RailHawks played host to the Los Angeles Galaxy of Major League Soccer in the third round of the Open Cup in front of a record home attendance of 7,939. After an early Galaxy goal, RailHawks forward Ty Shipalane scored an equalizer in the 75th minute, and Brian Shriver scored on a pass from Shipalane in the 88th minute to see the RailHawks earn a 2–1 win.

June

Carolina earned their first league win of 2012 on June 2 with a 2–1 home victory over the Puerto Rico Islanders. Ty Shipalane scored in the 88th minute to give the RailHawks the go-ahead goal.   June 5 saw the end of the RailHawks’ 2012 U.S. Open Cup after a home defeat to MLS team Chivas USA. Juan Pablo Ángel converted a penalty kick in stoppage time to give Chivas the 2–1 win.   On June 9 the Railhawks scored a 5–1 victory over then NASL leading Minnesota Stars. Rookie defender Austen King scored his only goal of the 2012 season in the 24th minute.   Midfielder Chris Nurse returned to the RailHawks on June 14 after international duty, where he captained the Guyana National Team in CONCACAF World Cup Qualifying losses to Mexico and Costa Rica.  Carolina earned a 2–0 road win against the Atlanta Silverbacks on June 16. The following week the RailHawks returned home and secured a 2–0 win over FC Edmonton, taking their league winning streak to four games. Bréiner Ortiz scored his first career goal for the RailHawks in the 38th minute on an assist from Schilawski.  The RailHawks ended the month of June in Fort Lauderdale, where they suffered a 2–1 loss to the Fort Lauderdale Strikers.

Club

Roster

Coaching staff
  Colin Clarke – Head Coach
  Dewan Bader – Assistant Coach
  John Bradford – Assistant Coach
  Greg Shields – Assistant Coach
  Nicolas Platter – Assistant Coach

Transfers

In

Out

Loan in

Loan out

Competitions

Preseason

North American Soccer League

Standings

Results summary

Match results

Playoffs

''Tampa Bay advances 5 - 4 on aggregate.

U.S. Open Cup

Statistics

See also 
 2012 in American soccer
 Carolina RailHawks FC

References 

North Carolina FC seasons
Carolina RailHawks Fc
Carolina RailHawks
Carolina RailHawks